Quantum is an online-only, open-access, peer-reviewed scientific journal for quantum science and related fields. The journal was established in 2017. Quantum is an arXiv overlay journal, meaning the journal's content is hosted on the arXiv.

Quantum is listed in the Directory of Open Access Journals and the Emerging Sources Citation Index, and it is recognized by the European Physical Society as maintaining a high standard of peer review.

See also
 Discrete Analysis

References

External links
 

Open access journals
Physics journals
Publications established in 2017
English-language journals
Online-only journals